Ambulyx siamensis is a species of moth of the family Sphingidae first described by Hiroshi Inoue in 1991. It is known from Yunnan in south-western China and from Thailand.

The larvae have been recorded feeding on Shorea obtusa in Thailand.

References

Ambulyx
Moths described in 1991
Moths of Asia